is a single by Japanese pop singer and songwriter Miho Komatsu released under Giza studio label. It was released 28 April 2004. The single reached #31 in its first week and sold 5,285 copies. It charted for three weeks and sold 6,670 copies in total.

Track listing
All songs are written and composed by Miho Komatsu

arrangement: Hirohito Furui (Garnet Crow)

arrangement: Satoru Kobayashi
calling 
arrangement: Furui
 (instrumental)

References 

2004 singles
Miho Komatsu songs
Songs written by Miho Komatsu
2004 songs
Giza Studio singles
Being Inc. singles
Song recordings produced by Daiko Nagato